Mount Spickard (pronounced SPICK'  erd) is a  mountain peak in the North Cascades, a mountain range in the U.S. state of Washington. It is composed mainly of gneiss and is part of two major drainage basins: that of the Skagit River and Fraser River.

It was named for a climber who fell to his death while ascending another nearby mountain peak. The first to ascend it was Walter B. Reaburn, in 1904.

Description

The main summit of Spickard has two sub-peaks. In his popular climbing guide, Fred Beckey uses the name "Peak 8824" for the northeast sub-peak.

High ridges connect Mount Spickard to other peaks. A ridge to the southwest connects Spickard with Twin Spires (also called Mox Peaks) and the Ridge of Gendarmes. The high ridges to the southeast of Mount Spickard are somewhat broken up by glacier-couloirs but connect Spickard with summits known as Tombstone Peak and Peak 7153. Another high ridge extends to the northeast. The ridge to the northwest is broken by a saddle point but otherwise extends several miles, curving north and east, around Silver Lake to Mount Custer Ridge, Mount Rahm, and Devils Tongue.

Hydrology
There are many glaciers on Mount Spickard's slopes and neighboring ridges. Silver Glacier extends over a mile from Spickard's summit north through a large cirque to Silver Lake.

There are four main drainage basins reaching to the slopes of Mount Spickard. Depot Creek flows west and northwest to join the Chilliwack River and, ultimately, the Fraser River, which flows into the Pacific Ocean in British Columbia. On the south side of Spickard are some headstreams of Perry Creek, which flows east to Little Beaver Creek and, via Ross Lake, the Skagit River. To the north Silver Lake Glacier sends meltwater into Silver Lake. Meltwater streams from glaciers on the east side of Mount Spickard join the outflow, Silver Creek, which flows east from Silver Lake to Ross Lake.

Access to the mountain is difficult due to the remote and rugged nature of the area. The easiest approach is from British Columbia via Chilliwack Lake and Depot Creek. There are two common approaches within Washington, both via water taxi on Ross Lake.

History
The geologist Reginald A. Daly studied the Spickard area in 1902 and 1906. He described Mount Spickard (then called Glacier Peak) and its neighbors as the most inaccessible summits of the entire U.S.–Canada border region west of the Flathead River of the Rocky Mountains. The first ascent was made in 1904 by Walter B. Reaburn. A second ascent was made the following year by Thomas Riggs Jr., George Neuner Jr., and J. Beall. In 1906, Noel J. Ogilvie and a Canadian party climbed Mount Spickard.

Mount Spickard was called Glacier Peak until 1963, when it was renamed in memory of Warren Spickard. Spickard was a distinguished mountaineer, who died in 1961 while climbing the nearby Northwest Twin Spires (also called Northwest Mox Peak or Northwest Mox). He had climbed Mount Spickard in 1955.

See also
 Mount Redoubt
 Stephen Mather Wilderness
 List of highest mountain peaks in Washington

References

Mountains of Whatcom County, Washington
North Cascades of Washington (state)
Mountains of Washington (state)